Habib Wahid (born 15 October 1979) is a Bangladeshi composer and singer. He works on modern pop music, EDM and a fusion of traditional Bengali folk music with contemporary techno and urban beats. His music is mainly influenced by British Bangladeshis, while he was living in the UK as a student. He is the son of the 1970s singer Ferdous Wahid. He has also produced music in Indian Bengali movies. He won Bangladesh National Film Award for Best Music Director for the film Projapoti (2011).

Early life
Habib Wahid was born and brought up in Dhaka, Bangladesh. His ancestral home is in Kusumpur in Srinagar of Munshiganj (Bikrampur).He attended South Breeze School in Dhanmondi. His father, Ferdous Wahid, was a Pop singer during the 1970s and 1980s.  A few years later, he went to England in pursuit of higher education and studied music & audio engineering at the School of Audio Engineering in London. He is also a solo singer.

Career

2003: Debut with Krishno
Habib Wahid started working with other Asian music producers such as Karsh Kale while in the UK. Wahid was already working as a music producer, however he needed a vocalist to develop his new album. While living in London, he found the vocalist Kaya, a Sylheti restaurant owner, who would collaborate with him on the album. In 2003, Wahid released his first album Krishno, a collaborative effort with Wahid producing the music while Kaya sang. The album proved to be a success in Britain and Bangladesh. The album Krishno was a fusion of folk and modern Ektaar Music Ltd, introducing a new genre to the Dhaka music arena.

2004–2014: Successful albums and soundtracks 
In the next few years, he released six albums, Maya (2004), Moina Go (2005), Shono (2006), Panjabiwala (2007), Bolchi Tomake (2008) and O Bosheshe (2008). To keep the Bangladeshi music growing, Wahid would usually introduce new artists in his albums. Besides Kaya, he has showcased singers such as Helal, Julee, Nirjhor, Shireen and Nancy in these albums. Wahid debuted as a vocalist in his album Moina Go where he sang two tracks, Din Gelo and Esho Brishti Namai. He also featured his father, Ferdous Wahid, as a singer in his albums. On 1 June 2011 Wahid's 8th album Ahoban! was released. The album consists of 9 tracks in which three are duet songs with Nancy and Kona and one track was sung by Ferdous Wahid. Wahid has released another album named Shadhin in December 2012.

In addition to his solo albums, Wahid also has released collaborative albums as well. Similar to how Krishno heavily featured Kaya, Maya also featured Kaya and Helal. In 2007, Wahid released the album Panjabiwala with Shireen Jawad. After featuring him on a number of tracks in different albums, Habib Wahid released a collaborative album with his father Ferdous Wahid, O Bosheshe, in 2008. Later with the label Deadline Music, Wahid would release Somorpon with Aurthohin & Warfaze in 2011, as well as Rong with Nancy in 2012.

He also has composed songs for different film soundtracks such as Hridoyer Kotha, Akash Chhoa Bhalobasa, Chandragrohon, I Love You, Eito Prem, Third Person Singular Number, Amar Ache Jol, and many others. Wahid makes songs that "has the essence from the roots of Bangla music", says Kumar Bishwajit while recording a song under the direction of Wahid in a movie called Projapoti.

2015–present: Singles and new projects 
Habib Wahid began a new chapter in his career with the release of his debut single, "Hariye Fela Bhalobasha", an R&B/Soul song. Wahid described this new chapter as a result of an evolved music market, saying that since his audience often buys his songs for ringtones, he can earn good profits from releasing one single at a time rather than an entire album. Later in the summer of 2015, Wahid released his second single "Mon Ghumay Re", a world song that blends rock, folk and electronic music. Wahid also performed at Bangla Beats in 2015, a concert in the UK promoting Bangla music and culture along with other artists including Ferdous Wahid, Nancy, Hridoy Khan and Mumzy Stranger. Wahid also produced the single "Cholo Bangladesh" for Grameenphone, a promotional song for the 2015 Cricket World Cup sung by rock musicians Zohad Reza Chowdhury and Imrul Karim Emil. Additional production for the track was done by Pritom Hasan, a musician who would work with Wahid and release his own music in the future.

Wahid began 2016 with the single "Tomar Akash", a pop song. In the summer Wahid released another single, "Moner Thikana", a love song written and produced by himself. A month later Wahid released "Beporawa Mon", a single that would later be used in the film Ami Tomar Hote Chai. Wahid also released other singles from different visual media, such as "Meghe Dhaka Shohor" from the TV serial of the same name and "Tumi Amar" from the film Sultana Bibiana, a duet with Nancy and additionally produced by Pritom Hasan. Later in 2016, Wahid released the single "Ei Bangla Ei Manush" for the World Bank's End Poverty Day campaign. The song is about the people of Bangladesh, and the success they have gotten in the ongoing fight against poverty.

To begin 2017, Wahid released his single "Tumi Hina", released independently through his label HW Productions. Wahid later released his single, "Mitthe Noy", on Valentine's Day. In contrast to the slow R&B songs that he just released, Wahid's "Ghum" is an upbeat pop electronic song which released in Spring 2017. In the summer, Wahid released the single "Golaper Din", which features frequent collaborator Nancy.

Personal life
Wahid first married Lubyana in 2003, and they were divorced in the same year. In 2011, he married Rehana Chowdhury which also ended up in divorce in January 2017. Together they have a son, Alim (b. 2012).

He announced in January 2021 that he had recently married Afsana Chowdhury Shifa. On 8 July 2021 they had a son named Ayaat.

Discography

Solo albums

Collaborative albums

Compilation albums

Singles

Awards 

|-
| 2006
| Habib Wahid
|Best Singer (Male)
|Meril Prothom Alo Awards
| 
|"Valobashbo Bashbo Re" from Hridoyer Kotha
| 
|-
| 2008
| Habib Wahid
|Best Singer (Male)
|Meril Prothom Alo Awards
| 
|Bolchi Tomake
| 
|-
|2009
| Habib Wahid
|Best Singer (Male)
|Meril Prothom Alo Awards
| 
|"Dwidha" from Third Person Singular Number
|
|-
|2010
| Habib Wahid
|Best Singer (Male)
|Meril Prothom Alo Awards
| 
|"Projapoti" from Projapoti
|
|-
|2011
| Habib Wahid
|Best Music Director
|National Film Awards
| 
|Projapoti
|
|-
|2012
| Habib Wahid
|Best Singer (Male)
|Meril Prothom Alo Awards
| 
|Shadhin
|

References

External links
 

Living people
21st-century Bangladeshi male singers
21st-century Bangladeshi singers
Bangladeshi composers
Best Music Director National Film Award (Bangladesh) winners
1979 births
Bangladeshi guitarists
21st-century guitarists
Best Male Singer Meril-Prothom Alo Award winners
Laser Vision artists